Michael Geoffrey Peers (born 31 July 1934) is a Canadian retired Anglican bishop who served as Primate of the Anglican Church of Canada from 1986 to 2004.

Life and career
Born in Vancouver, British Columbia, Peers completed an undergraduate degree in languages at the University of British Columbia in 1956 and a diploma in translation at the University of Heidelberg in 1957.  He had intended to embark on a career in diplomacy.

In the meantime, an interest in religion (which had begun in his youth after a non-religious upbringing) increased and he decided to seek ordination. He entered Trinity College at the University of Toronto, where he obtained a licentiate in theology. He was ordained as an Anglican priest and served in the following positions:

Curate of Holy Trinity, Ottawa, in 1963
Rector of St. Bede's, Winnipeg, 1965
Archdeacon of Winnipeg, River North Anglican Parishes, Winnipeg, 1971
Dean of Qu'Appelle (Regina, Saskatchewan) and rector of St. Paul's Cathedral, Regina, 1976 – 1978
Bishop of Qu'Appelle (Regina, Saskatchewan), 1976 – 1986
Archbishop of Qu'Appelle and Metropolitan of the Ecclesiastical Province of Rupert's Land, 1981 – 1986
Primate of Canada, 1986 – 2004

Peers speaks English, French, Spanish, German and Russian. He is married with three children and four grandchildren. He currently resides in Toronto, Ontario where he is Ecumenist-in-Residence at the Toronto School of Theology. In 2006 his Grace Notes: Journeying With the Primate, 1995–2004, a collection of his monthly columns in the Anglican Journal, was published, and in 2007 his The Anglican Episcopate in Canada: Volume IV, 1977–2007.

Peers is now confessor to the monastery of the Society of St. John the Evangelist in Boston.  He is also Ecumenist in Residence at the Toronto School of Theology.

Ministry on the prairies
Having come from a background that might have suggested to prairie folk that he was an "eastern" élitist, Peers quickly established himself as keen sympathiser with the ideals of prairie populism. Rural Saskatchewanians quickly perceived that Peers was their ardent supporter—that the ideals of prairie populism were his own ideals—and that his obvious membership in the Canadian élite was entirely to their advantage. The life of a prairie bishop is one of endless travel along the highways and byways of the prairie hinterland: in the course of such travels Peers made long and lasting friendships with many members of the Saskatchewan leadership, as with many grassroots Saskatchewanians, and these friendships amply informed the national and worldwide ministry of his primacy.

Major events of his primacy
Major events include:
the introduction of the Book of Alternative Services (to supplement — but in effect replace — the Book of Common Prayer, and over the objections of the Prayer Book Society of Canada, which unsuccessfully litigated the matter in an ecclesiastical court over which Archbishop Peers presided);
the achieving of full communion with the Evangelical Lutheran Church in Canada (in which he played a pivotal role);
the formal apology to native peoples for the abuses which occurred in the Residential Schools;
financial settlement with the federal government over aboriginal claims against native residential schools operated on the government's behalf principally by Anglican and Roman Catholic churches;
en route to the 1978 Lambeth Conference touched down in the newly independent Solomon Islands and the then-North Solomons Province of Papua New Guinea though it was Roman Catholic and United Church, to the former of which he and Mrs. Peers returned, having established friendly relations and later as Primate sending a bishop;  
the stand taken by the Anglican Church in 1986 in support of Canada's northern people, who depended on the seal hunt, against the international animal rights lobby; towards the end of his tenure,
the emergence of the issue of the ordination of gay and lesbian clergy (which he supported); and
his presidency of the Metropolitan Council of Cuba (a council that oversees the episcopal work of the Protestant Episcopal Church of Cuba, once a part of the Episcopal Church in the United States which is because of US government policy no longer able to take any role there);
his cultivation of a much closer relationship between the Anglican Church of Canada and the Episcopal Church of the United States.

External links

 Biography from the Anglican Church of Canada

1934 births
Living people
People from Vancouver
20th-century Anglican Church of Canada bishops
Anglican bishops of Qu'Appelle
University of Toronto alumni
Trinity College (Canada) alumni
Primates of the Anglican Church of Canada
Metropolitans of Rupert's Land
Deans of Qu'Appelle
Archdeacons of Winnipeg